Guzal Bolagh (also Romanized as Gūzal Bolāgh) is a village in Safa Khaneh Rural District, in the Central District of Shahin Dezh County, West Azerbaijan Province, Iran. At the 2006 census, its population was 667, in 136 families.

References 

Populated places in Shahin Dezh County